Oliver C. Brown (sometimes credited as Oliver Brown)  is an American percussionist.  Brown was one of the original members of KC & The Sunshine Band. For over four decades, Brown has played with well-known performers from Natalie Cole to Jermaine Jackson.

Early years and KC & The Sunshine Band 

Brown’s first big break came in Florida with TK Records as their in house percussionist.  He recorded and/or toured with most of their artists, including Benny Latimore, Little Beaver, Clarence Reid, Betty Wright, Gwen McCrae, and George McCrae.  Following this, he became one of the original members of KC and The Sunshine Band as they recorded their 1974 debut album Do It Good, followed by the album KC and the Sunshine Band which featured "Get Down Tonight" and "That's the Way (I Like It)", their first number one hits on the Billboard charts.

Late 1970s & early 1980s 

After moving to Los Angeles, California, Brown expanded his musical horizons with the aid of his brother, Eddie Brown of the famed folk duet of the sixties, Joe and Eddie.   Eddie Brown arranged his first recording session in L.A. with Gene McDaniels who recorded the 1960s hit, "A Hundred Pounds of Clay".  McDaniels was producing Nancy Wilson at the time, so Eddie told McDaniels of Oliver Brown’s credits with KC and The Sunshine Band, who were then featured on the cover of Cashbox magazine.  McDaniels then invited Brown to the studio to meet him where to his surprise in the studio were sitting:  George Duke on keyboards, Ron Carter on Bass, and Steve Gadd on drums.  His knees began to knock, at the prospect of being thrown cold into a session with some of the world’s finest musicians.  But, to his relief, McDaniels had planned to have him do an overdub the next day.  He successfully completed the recording session and earned his credits on Nancy Wilson’s album, This Mother's Daughter.  This opened the door for more recording and touring with such artists as Jermaine Jackson, The Whispers, Larry Vann, Billy Preston, Leo Sayer, Al Jarreau, Natalie Cole, Thelma Houston, saxophonist Cal Bennett, John Stewart, Doug Mcleod, The Beach Boys, Ron Thompson, Chris Bennett, Nils, Fleetwood Mac, Mick Fleetwood’s Blue Whale Blues Band and many other Warner Brothers, Capitol Records and Motown Recording artists.

Gravity 180 

Eventually, Brown became the third member of the trio Gravity 180, which he considers to be his greatest artistic achievement to date.  The other members of the trio are:  Clydene Jackson on keyboards with phenomenal vocals, and Harold Payne on acoustic guitar with superb vocals.  Payne and Jackson are the main songwriters for the group. Brown has stated that the group has given him the opportunity to express percussion in a way that could be said to be a percussionist’s dream. Gravity 180 was conceived without the aid of trap drums or a bass player; Jackson plays left hand keyboard bass.  This gave Brown the opportunity to cover all the territory of trap drums and percussion in the arrangements of their music (driven by percussion).

Nils 

Nils is a Billboard #1 Smooth Jazz artist.  Brown performed on all of Nils' albums from his hit   Pacific Coast Highway to his current album titled City Groove. Brown continues to perform with Nils and Gravity 180 as well as with other prominent artists around the globe.

Film 

Brown was featured in Gravity 180, the 2012 documentary film about the group, written, directed, co-produced and edited by two-time award-winning filmmaker Len Rosen.   The film was a featured documentary at the Monaco Film Festival in May 2012, and was granted an Honorary award.

Collaborations 
With Natalie Cole
 Thankful (Capitol Records, 1977)

With Cher
 Prisoner (Casablanca Records, 1979)

With Syreeta Wright
 Rich Love, Poor Love (Motown, 1977)

With Brian Cadd
 Yesterdaydreams (Capitol Records, 1978)

References

External links 
 The Billboard Book of Number One Hits: Updated and Expanded 5Th Edition. Fred Bronson. Random House Digital, Inc. 2003. p. 465. (photo?)
Oliver C. Brown Interview NAMM Oral History Library (2020)

1946 births
Living people
African-American musicians
American percussionists
American session musicians
Musicians from Berkeley, California
KC and the Sunshine Band members